Hélder Cavaco (born 3 September 1965) is a Portuguese sports shooter. He competed in the mixed trap event at the 1988 Summer Olympics.

References

1965 births
Living people
Portuguese male sport shooters
Olympic shooters of Portugal
Shooters at the 1988 Summer Olympics
Place of birth missing (living people)